"More popular than Jesus" is part of a remark made by John Lennon of the Beatles in a March 1966 interview in which he argued that the public were more infatuated with the band than with Jesus and that Christian faith was declining to the extent that it might be outlasted by rock music. His opinions drew no controversy when originally published in the London newspaper The Evening Standard, but drew angry reactions from Christian communities when republished in the United States that July.

Lennon's comments incited protests and threats, particularly throughout the Bible Belt in the Southern US. Some radio stations stopped playing Beatles songs, records were publicly burned, and press conferences were cancelled. The controversy coincided with the band's 1966 US tour and overshadowed press coverage of their newest album, Revolver. Lennon apologised repeatedly at a series of press conferences and explained that he was not comparing himself or the band to Christ.

The controversy exacerbated the band's unhappiness with touring, which they never undertook again before their break-up in 1970; Lennon also refrained from touring in his solo career. Some Christian critics also found Lennon's 1971 song "Imagine" offensive. In 1980, Lennon was murdered by Mark David Chapman, a Christian-raised fan of the Beatles who had been alienated by Lennon's quote and lyrics from "Imagine" (although he gave other motives for the killing).

Background 

In March 1966, London's Evening Standard ran a weekly series titled "How Does a Beatle Live?" that featured John Lennon, Ringo Starr, George Harrison and Paul McCartney. The articles were written by Maureen Cleave, who knew the group well and had interviewed them regularly since the start of Beatlemania in the United Kingdom. She had described them three years earlier as "the darlings of Merseyside", and in February 1964 had accompanied them on their first visit to the United States. She chose to interview the band members individually for the lifestyle series, rather than as a group.

Cleave carried out the interview with Lennon in February at his home, Kenwood, in Weybridge. Her article portrayed him as restless and searching for meaning in his life; he discussed his interest in Indian music and said he gleaned most of his knowledge from reading books. Among Lennon's many possessions, Cleave found a full-sized crucifix, a gorilla costume, a medieval suit of armour and a well-organised library with works by Alfred, Lord Tennyson, Jonathan Swift, Oscar Wilde, George Orwell and Aldous Huxley. Another book, Hugh J. Schonfield's The Passover Plot, had influenced Lennon's ideas about Christianity, although Cleave did not refer to it in the article. She mentioned that Lennon was "reading extensively about religion", and quoted him as saying:

Cleave's interview with Lennon was published in The Evening Standard on 4 March under the secondary heading "On a hill in Surrey ... A young man, famous, loaded, and waiting for something". The article provoked no controversy in the UK. Church attendance there was in decline and Christian churches were attempting to transform their image, to make themselves more "relevant to modern times". According to author Jonathan Gould: "The satire comedians had had a field day with the increasingly desperate attempts of the Church to make itself seem more relevant ('Don't call me vicar, call me Dick ...')." In 1963, Bishop of Woolwich John A.T. Robinson published Honest to God urging the nation to reject traditional church teachings on morality and the concept of God as an "old man in the sky", and instead embrace a universal ethic of love. Bryan R. Wilson's 1966 text Religion in Secular Society explained that increasing secularisation led to British churches being abandoned. However, traditional Christian faith was still strong and widespread in the United States at that time. The theme of religion's irrelevance in American society had nevertheless been featured in a cover article titled "Is God Dead?" in Time magazine, in an issue dated 8 April 1966.

Both McCartney and Harrison had been baptised in the Roman Catholic Church, but neither of them followed Christianity. In his interview with Cleave, Harrison was also outspoken about organised religion, as well as the Vietnam War and authority figures in general, whether "religious or secular". He said: "If Christianity's as good as they say it is, it should stand up to a bit of discussion." According to author Steve Turner, the British satirical magazine Private Eye responded to Lennon's comments by featuring a cartoon by Gerald Scarfe that showed him "dressed in heavenly robes and playing a cross-shaped guitar with a halo made out of a vinyl LP".

Publication in the US
Newsweek made reference to Lennon's "more popular than Jesus" comments in an issue published in March, and the interview had appeared in Detroit magazine in May. On 3 July, Cleave's four Beatles interviews were published together in a five-page article in The New York Times Magazine, titled "Old Beatles – A Study in Paradox". None of these provoked a strong reaction.

Beatles press officer Tony Barrow offered the four interviews to Datebook, an American teen magazine. He believed that the pieces were important to show fans that the Beatles were progressing beyond simple pop music and producing more intellectually challenging work. Datebook was a liberal magazine that addressed subjects such as interracial dating and legalisation of marijuana, so it seemed an appropriate publication for the interviews. Managing editor Danny Fields played a role in shining a spotlight on Lennon's comments.

Datebook published the Lennon and McCartney interviews on 29 July, in its September "Shout-Out" issue dedicated to controversial youth-orientated themes including recreational drugs, sex, long hair and the Vietnam War. Art Unger, the magazine's editor, put a quote from Lennon's interview on the cover: "I don't know which will go first – rock 'n' roll or Christianity!" In author Robert Rodriguez's description, the editor had chosen Lennon's "most damning comment" for maximum effect; placed above it on the cover was a quote from McCartney regarding America: "It's a lousy country where anyone black is a dirty nigger!" Only McCartney's image was featured on the front cover, as Unger expected that his statement would spark the most controversy. The same Lennon quote appeared as the headline above the feature article. Beside the text, Unger included a photo of Lennon on a yacht, gazing across the ocean with his hand shielding his eyes, accompanied by the caption: "John Lennon sights controversy and sets sail directly towards it. That's the way he likes to live!"

Escalation and radio bans
In late July, Unger sent copies of the interviews to radio stations in the American South. WAQY disc jockey Tommy Charles in Birmingham, Alabama, heard about Lennon's remarks from his co-presenter Doug Layton and said, "That does it for me. I am not going to play the Beatles any more." During their 29 July breakfast show, Charles and Layton asked for listeners' views on Lennon's comment, and the response was overwhelmingly negative. The pair set about destroying Beatles vinyl LPs on-air. Charles later stated, "We just felt it was so absurd and sacrilegious that something ought to be done to show them that they can't get away with this sort of thing." United Press International bureau manager Al Benn heard the WAQY show and filed a news report in New York City, culminating in a major story in The New York Times on 5 August. Sales of Datebook, which had never been a leading title in the youth magazine market beforehand, reached a million copies.

Lennon's remarks were deemed blasphemous by some right-wing religious groups. More than 30 radio stations, including some in New York and Boston, followed WAQY's lead by refusing to play the Beatles' music. WAQY hired a tree-grinding machine and invited listeners to deliver their Beatles merchandise for destruction. KCBN in Reno, Nevada, broadcast hourly editorials condemning the Beatles and announced a public bonfire for 6 August where the band's albums would be burned. Several Southern stations organised demonstrations with bonfires, drawing crowds of teenagers to publicly burn their Beatles records, effigies of the band, and other memorabilia. Photos of teenagers eagerly participating in the bonfires were widely distributed throughout the US, and the controversy received blanket media coverage through television reports.

The furore came to be known as the "'More popular than Jesus' controversy" or the "Jesus controversy". It followed soon after the negative reaction from American disc jockeys and retailers to the "butcher" sleeve photo used on the Beatles' US-only LP Yesterday and Today. Withdrawn and replaced within days of release in June, this LP cover showed the band members dressed as butchers and covered in dismembered plastic dolls and pieces of raw meat. For some conservatives in the American South, according to Rodriguez, Lennon's comments on Christ now allowed them an opportunity to act on their grievances against the Beatles – namely, their long hair and championing of African-American musicians.

Pre-tour press conferences

According to Unger, Brian Epstein was initially unperturbed about the reaction from the Birmingham disc jockeys, telling him: "Arthur, if they burn Beatles records, they've got to buy them first." Within days, however, Epstein became so concerned by the furore that he considered cancelling the group's upcoming US tour, fearing that they would be seriously harmed in some way. He flew to New York on 4 August and held a press conference the following day in which he claimed that Datebook had taken Lennon's words out of context, and expressed regret on behalf of the group that "people with certain religious beliefs should have been offended in any way". Epstein's efforts had little effect, as the controversy quickly spread beyond the United States. In Mexico City, there were demonstrations against the Beatles, and a number of countries banned the Beatles' music on national radio stations, including South Africa and Spain. The Vatican issued a denouncement of Lennon's comments, saying that "Some subjects must not be dealt with profanely, not even in the world of beatniks." This international disapproval was reflected in the share price of the Beatles' Northern Songs publishing company, which dropped by the equivalent of 28 cents on the London Stock Exchange.

In response to the furore in the US, a Melody Maker editorial stated that the "fantastically unreasoned reaction" supported Lennon's statement regarding Christ's disciples being "thick and ordinary". Daily Express columnist Robert Pitman wrote, "It seems a nerve for Americans to hold up shocked hands, when week in, week out, America is exporting to us [in Britain] a subculture that makes the Beatles seem like four stern old churchwardens." The reaction was also criticised within the US; a Kentucky radio station announced that it would give the Beatles music airplay to show its "contempt for hypocrisy personified", and the Jesuit magazine America wrote that "Lennon was simply stating what many a Christian educator would readily admit."

Epstein proposed that Lennon record an apology at EMI Studios, with Beatles producer George Martin taping. Because Lennon was away on holiday, this would have required him to record it by phone. According to EMI recording engineer Geoff Emerick, engineers spent several days designing a dummy plaster head to amplify a phone recording to make it sound more realistic. This plan was abandoned when Lennon decided against recording the apology.

Lennon's apology

The Beatles left London on 11 August for their US tour. Lennon's wife Cynthia said that he was nervous and upset because he had made people angry simply by expressing his opinion. The Beatles held a press conference in Barrow's suite at the Astor Tower Hotel in Chicago. Lennon did not want to apologise but was advised by Epstein and Barrow that he should. Lennon was also distressed that he had potentially endangered the lives of his bandmates by speaking his mind. While preparing to meet the reporters, he broke down in tears in front of Epstein and Barrow. To present a more conservative image for the cameras, the Beatles eschewed their London fashions for dark suits, plain shirts, and neckties.

At the press conference, Lennon said: "I suppose if I had said television was more popular than Jesus, I would have got away with it. I'm sorry I opened my mouth. I'm not anti-God, anti-Christ, or anti-religion. I was not knocking it. I was not saying we are greater or better." He stressed that he had been remarking on how other people viewed and popularised the Beatles. He described his own view of God by quoting the Bishop of Woolwich, "not as an old man in the sky. I believe that what people call God is something in all of us." He was adamant that he was not comparing himself with Christ, but attempting to explain the decline of Christianity in the UK. "If you want me to apologise," he concluded, "if that will make you happy, then OK, I'm sorry."

Journalists gave a sympathetic response and told Lennon that people in the Bible Belt were "quite notorious for their Christian attitude". Placated by Lennon's gesture, Tommy Charles cancelled WAQY's Beatles bonfire, which had been planned for 19 August, when the Beatles were due to perform in the South. The Vatican's newspaper L'Osservatore Romano announced that the apology was sufficient, while a New York Times editorial similarly stated that the matter was over, but added, "The wonder is that such an articulate young man could have expressed himself imprecisely in the first place."

In a private meeting with Unger, Epstein asked him to surrender his press pass for the tour, saying that it had been a "bad idea" for Unger to publish the interviews, and to avoid accusations that Datebook and the Beatles' management had orchestrated the controversy as a publicity stunt. Epstein assured him that there would be better publishing opportunities for the magazine if he "voluntarily" withdrew from the tour. Unger refused and, in his account, received Lennon's full support when he later discussed the meeting with him.

US tour incidents

The tour was initially marred by protests and disturbances, and an undercurrent of tension. On 13 August, when the band played in Detroit, images were published of members of the South Carolina Ku Klux Klan "crucifying" a Beatles record on a large wooden cross, which they then ceremoniously burned. That night, the Texas radio station KLUE held a large Beatles bonfire, only for a lightning bolt to strike its transmission tower the following day and send the station temporarily off-air. The Beatles received telephone threats, and the Ku Klux Klan picketed their concerts in Washington, DC, and Memphis, Tennessee. The latter was the tour's only stop in the Deep South and was expected to be a flashpoint for the controversy. Two concerts took place there at the Mid-South Coliseum on 19 August, although the city council had voted to cancel them rather than have "municipal facilities be used as a forum to ridicule anyone's religion", adding that "the Beatles are not welcome in Memphis".

An ITN news team sent from London to cover the controversy for the program Reporting '66 held interviews with Charles and with teenagers in Birmingham, many of whom were critical of the Beatles. ITN reporter Richard Lindley also interviewed Robert Shelton, the Ku Klux Klan's Imperial Wizard, who condemned the band for supporting civil rights and said they were communists. Coinciding with the band's visit to Memphis, local preacher Jimmy Stroad held a Christian rally to "give the youth of the mid-South an opportunity to show Jesus Christ is more popular than the Beatles". Outside the Coliseum, a young Klansman told a TV reporter that the Klan were a "terror organization" and would use their "ways and means" to stop the Beatles performing. During the evening show, an audience member threw a firecracker onto the stage, leading the band to believe that they were the target of gunfire.

At press conferences later in the tour, Lennon attempted to avoid the subject of his "Jesus" comments, reasoning that no further discussion was necessary. Rather than shying away from controversy, however, the Beatles became increasingly vocal about topical issues such as the Vietnam War. In Toronto on 17 August, Lennon expressed his approval of Americans who evaded the draft by crossing the border into Canada. At their New York press conference on 22 August, the Beatles shocked reporters by emphatically condemning the Vietnam War as "wrong".

The Beatles hated the tour, partly due to the controversy and adverse reaction to Lennon's comments, and they were unhappy about Epstein continuing to organise live performances that were increasingly at odds with their studio work. The controversy had also overshadowed the American release of their 1966 album Revolver, which the band considered to be their best and most mature musical work yet. Following the tour, Harrison contemplated leaving the group, but he decided to remain on the condition that the Beatles would focus solely on studio recording.

Legacy

Cultural impact and validity of Lennon's claim
In 1993, Michael Medved wrote in The Sunday Times that "today, comments like Lennon's could never cause controversy; a contemptuous attitude to religion is all but expected from all mainstream pop performers." In 1997, Noel Gallagher claimed that his band Oasis was "bigger than God", but reaction was minimal. The following day Melanie C responded to Gallagher saying "If Oasis are bigger than God, what does that make the Spice Girls? Bigger than Buddha? Because we are a darn sight bigger than Oasis". Writing for Mojo magazine in 2002, David Fricke credited Cleave's Lennon interview and the "More popular than Jesus" controversy as marking the start of modern music journalism. He said that it was "no coincidence" that Paul Williams, a seventeen-year-old Swarthmore College student, launched America's first serious rock publication, Crawdaddy!, in 1966, given the Beatles' influence and Lennon's "sense of mission" as a spokesman for youth culture.

Lennon's comments continued to be the subject of scrutiny in right-wing religious literature, particularly in the writing of David Noebel, a longstanding critic of the Beatles' influence on American youth. According to a 1987 article by Mark Sullivan in the journal Popular Music, a photo from WAYX's Beatles bonfire in Waycross, Georgia, which shows a child presenting the Meet the Beatles! LP for burning, became "Probably the most famous photograph of the entire anti-rock movement".  According to Steve Turner, the episode became "so much a part of history" that the words "More popular than Jesus" are synonymous with the 1966 controversy.

The controversy was parodied in the 1978 mockumentary All You Need Is Cash, when Neil Innes, playing Ron Nasty, a John Lennon parody in the fictional band The Rutles, claimed that he really said "Bigger than Rod (Stewart)".

In 2012, Nathan Smith of the Houston Press compared several aspects of popular media and concluded that Jesus was more popular than the Beatles. In 2015, Philippine Star contributor Edgar O. Cruz said that Lennon's statement proved to be at least half-wrong, reporting that "rock 'n roll is dead but Christianity expanded with Catholicism experiencing exceptional growth through Pope Francis' lead".

Lennon's life and career

Former Beatles press officer Derek Taylor referred to the controversy in a late 1966 article for the Los Angeles Times West: "I'm seriously worried about someone with a rifle. After all, there's no Kennedy anymore; but you can always shoot John Lennon." After the tour, the Beatles took a break and reconvened in November 1966 to begin recording Sgt. Pepper's Lonely Hearts Club Band, which was a major success when released in June 1967. Lennon wanted Jesus to be included in the menagerie of figures featured on the album's cover, but this was not done because of the past year's controversial statement.

At various points in 1968, Lennon claimed to be the living reincarnation of Christ. In May 1969, the band released "The Ballad of John and Yoko" as a single, with Lennon singing the lines, "Christ, you know it ain't easy, you know how hard it can be / The way things are going, they're gonna crucify me." Lennon called himself "one of Christ's biggest fans" during a BBC interview at the time. He also talked about the Church of England, his vision of heaven, and unhappiness over being unable to marry Yoko Ono in church as a divorcee. In December 1969, Lennon was asked whether he would play the part of Jesus in Andrew Lloyd Webber and Tim Rice's new musical Jesus Christ Superstar. Lennon had no interest in the part, although he said that he would have been interested if Ono could play the part of Mary Magdalene.

Lennon repeated his opinion that the Beatles were more influential on young people than Christ during a trip to Canada in 1969, adding that some ministers had agreed with him. He called the American protestors "fascist Christians", saying that he was "very big on Christ" and "I've always fancied him. He was right." In 1977, Lennon briefly converted to Christianity after becoming a fan of several televangelists. He also corresponded with some, including Oral Roberts and Pat Robertson. In 1978, Lennon said that, if he had not made the "more popular" comment, "I might still be up there with all the other performing fleas! God bless America. Thank you, Jesus."

In his 1970 song "God", Lennon sang that he did not believe in Jesus, the Bible, Buddha, the Gita, nor the Beatles. Fundamentalist Christian critics of Lennon's lyrics have focused on the opening line from his 1971 song "Imagine", which states, "Imagine there's no heaven." Lennon was murdered on 8 December 1980 by Mark David Chapman, a disillusioned Christian and former fan of the Beatles who had been incensed by Lennon's "more popular than Jesus" remark and lyrics from "Imagine", considering them blasphemous, although he cited other motives.

Vatican response
In April 2010, the Vatican newspaper L'Osservatore Romano published an article marking the 40th anniversary of the Beatles' self-titled album (also known as the "White Album") which included comments on Lennon's "more popular than Jesus" remark. Part of the response read: "The remark ... which triggered deep indignation, mainly in the United States, after many years sounds only like a 'boast' by a young working-class Englishman faced with unexpected success, after growing up in the legend of Elvis and rock and roll." Ringo Starr responded: "Didn't the Vatican say we were possibly Satanic, and they've still forgiven us? I think the Vatican's got more to talk about than the Beatles."

See also
Religion in the United Kingdom
Religion in the United States
Religious views of the Beatles

Notes

References
Citations

Sources

External links
 Lennon's full "How Does a Beatle Live?" interview at Rock's Backpages

History of the Beatles
Christianity in popular culture controversies
Censorship in the arts
1966 in music
1966 controversies
1966 in Christianity
Criticism of Christianity
Religious controversies in music
English phrases
1966 neologisms
Quotations from music
History of religion in the United States